Ronald Shaw (1 January 1924 – November 1991) was an English professional footballer who spent his entire professional career with Torquay United, making 384 appearances in the Football League.

References

1924 births
1991 deaths
English footballers
Harrow Borough F.C. players
Torquay United F.C. players
English Football League players
Association football midfielders